Liptena kiellandi is a butterfly in the family Lycaenidae. It is found in Kenya and Tanzania. The habitat consists of forests.

Subspecies
Liptena kiellandi kiellandi (Tanzania)
Liptena kiellandi kakamegae Congdon & Collins, 1998 (Kenya)

References

Butterflies described in 1998
Liptena